Siviwe Gwarube (born 14 July 1989) is a South African politician who has served as the Chief Whip of the Official Opposition since August 2022. She has been a Member of the National Assembly of South Africa since May 2019. She was the Shadow Minister of Health from June 2019 until February 2022, the National Spokesperson of the Democratic Alliance from November 2020 until August 2022 and the Deputy Chief Whip of the Official Opposition from December 2021 until August 2022.

Early life and education
Gwarube was born in KwaMdingi, King William's Town. She was raised by her grandmother. She attended Kingsridge High School for Girls. Gwarube holds a BA degree in law, Politics and Philosophy from Rhodes University in Grahamstown.

Career
Gwarube began her career working in communications. She was employed in the office of the then-leader of the opposition Lindiwe Mazibuko in 2012. Gwarube later worked as the Head of Ministry at the Western Cape Department of Health under Provincial Minister Nomafrench Mbombo. Prior to her election to Parliament, she was head of the DA's communications department.

She was sworn in as an MP on 22 May 2019. DA parliamentary leader Mmusi Maimane appointed her Shadow Minister of Health on 5 June 2019. Newly elected parliamentary leader John Steenhuisen (elected in October 2019) kept her in her post. Gwarube was the DA's COVID-19 spokesperson during the pandemic. On 24 November 2020, she was announced as the DA's new national spokesperson.

Gwarube was elected as the deputy chief whip of the DA parliamentary caucus in a hotly-contested internal midterm caucus election on 2 December 2021, defeating Chris Hunsinger and Angel Khanyile. Gwarube replaced Jacques Julius, who had decided against running for re-election. She remained as the DA's national spokesperson. On 24 February 2022, Michéle Clarke replaced her as Shadow Minister of Health.

On 18 August 2022, Gwarube was appointed as the Chief Whip of the DA caucus in the National Assembly and consequently became the Chief Whip of the Official Opposition, succeeding Natasha Mazzone. Solly Malatsi succeeded her as the DA's national spokesperson.

References

External links
Ms Siviwe Gwarube – Parliament of South Africa
Siviwe Gwarube – People's Assembly

Living people
1989 births
Democratic Alliance (South Africa) politicians
Members of the National Assembly of South Africa
Women members of the National Assembly of South Africa
Rhodes University alumni
People from Qonce
People from Buffalo City Metropolitan Municipality